The 1947 NYU Violets football team was an American football team that represented New York University as an independent during the 1947 college football season. In its first season under head coach Edward Mylin, the team compiled a 2–5–1 record and was outscored by a total of 194 to 65. The team played its home games at the Polo Grounds in Upper Manhattan and Yankee Stadium in The Bronx.

Schedule

References

NYU
NYU Violets football seasons
NYU Violets football